Arturo Araujo Fajardo (1878 – December 1, 1967) was the president of El Salvador from March 1, 1931, to December 2, 1931. He was overthrown in a military coup led by junior officers, and was forced to flee the country for Guatemala. An agricultural leader and engineer, Araujo had been elected in what is generally reckoned as the country's first honest presidential contest.

Arturo Araujo was a distant relative of Manuel Enrique Araujo. Pachita Tennant Mejía de Pike, who is familiar with the history of Salvadoran families, says that the Araujo family mostly comes from the town of Jucuapa, in the department of Usulután, El Salvador. However, Arturo Araujo's family originally came from Suchitoto, in the department of Cuscatlán, moving to Santa Tecla around 1885. 
His parents were Enriqueta Fajardo de Araujo and Dr. Eugenio Araujo, Finance Minister in the Administration of General Francisco Menéndez. He spent some time studying in Liverpool, England. It was there that Araujo became involved with Labour Party politics. He also met his English wife, Dora née Morton, while a student there.

Biography

Araujo was a member of land-owning oligarchy of El Salvador. He made an unsuccessful bid for presidency in 1919. Before that,  his speech at the first workers congress in the western town of Armenia earned him the nickname "Benefactor of the general people." In 1922, he made a failed attempt to invade the country from Honduras.

The free elections in 1931 failed to obtain a plurality for any of the candidate. Arturo won the elections with the backing of his supporters in the congress. Alberto Masferrer had proposed a nine-point reform program of the country, based on which the president promised food, cloth, work and housing to every Salvadoran. However, Government corruption and the Great Depression created disadvantage for the president.

Soon he was overthrown in a military coup, and with his overthrow began five decades of military rule in the country.

Notes

1878 births
1967 deaths
People from La Libertad Department (El Salvador)
Presidents of El Salvador
Leaders ousted by a coup